Yulia Ogloblina (born 1 November 1989, Torbeyevo) is a Russian political figure and a deputy of the 8th State Duma. 

In 2009, Oglobina joined The All-Russian Youth Public Organization “Russian Union of Rural Youth”. She held the positions of regional office specialist and executive director. From 2012 to 2021, Oglobina was the Chairman of the Russian Union of Rural Youth. From 2017 to 2021, she was a member of the Civic Chamber of the Russian Federation. She was also a member of the central headquarters of the All-Russia People's Front. In 2020, she was a member of the working group to prepare proposals for the 2020 amendments to the Constitution of Russia. Since September 2021, she has served as the deputy of the 8th State Duma.

References

1989 births
Living people
United Russia politicians
21st-century Russian politicians
Eighth convocation members of the State Duma (Russian Federation)
21st-century Russian women politicians